Carlos Isaías Morales Williams (born December 3, 1993), better known as Sech, is a Panamanian singer. He is from the Río Abajo township of Panama City and is best known for his single "Otro Trago", which was nominated for Best Urban Song and Best Urban Fusion/Performance at the 2019 Latin Grammy Awards. He has collaborated with numerous Latin artists including Maluma, Anitta, Nicky Jam, Daddy Yankee, and Bad Bunny. He released his debut studio album Sueños in April 2019 and his second album 1 of 1  was released on May 21, 2020.

Biography

1993–2014: Early life and career beginnings
Carlos Isaías Morales Williams was born the youngest of four children in the Río Abajo township of Panama City to parents who were both pastors. He developed his singing voice while singing in his church's choir. He additionally enjoyed writing poetry and singing along to the music of Boyz II Men. After high school, he worked in the food service and construction industries while producing music on the side with his friend Focking Rafita. He began his musical career in Panama as a street vendor who also sang to customers. Morales started his career in the group Los Principiantes. His first song with the group, titled "Te Llamaba", was released in June 2008.

2014–2018: Solo career and national success 
In 2014, Sech released his debut single "Yo Sin Ti". Between 2014 and 2017, Sech began releasing new songs until the release of "Miss Lonely", which became his first national hit and gave him his national recognition. The song went viral in Colombia and attracted the attention of producer and DJ Dimelo Flow. Following this, Sech was signed to Rich Music in 2017, and in December of that year, he released his first mixtape album, titled The Sensation Mixtape.

Sech's debut extended play The Sensation, was released on December 6, 2018. Consisting of 8 songs, the album includes the singles "Me Gustaría", "La Vida" and the original version of "Que Más Pues", which its remix would be included on his following release. The album also features guest appearances from International artists, including Justin Quiles, Jowell & Randy and Dalex.

2019–present
In April 2019, Sech released "Otro Trago". The song reached number one in his native Panama, as well in Spain, Argentina, Colombia, Peru, Paraguay, Honduras and Mexico. It also became Sech's first entry on the US Billboard Hot 100 peaking at number 34. Sech describes "Otro Trago" as "the song that truly changed [his] life". The track was nominated for Best Urban Song and Best Urban Fusion/Performance at the 2019 Latin Grammy Awards. That same month, Sech released his debut studio album Sueños, which reached number three on the Billboard Top Latin Albums chart. The album includes the Panamanian top 10 single "Solita" featuring Farruko and Zion & Lennox. It also includes the remix of the song "Qué Más Pues" featuring Maluma, Nicky Jam, Lenny Tavarez, Justin Quiles and Dalex. Sueños was ranked number three on the Rolling Stone list of the "25 Best Latin Albums of 2019". In August 2019, Suzy Exposito of Rolling Stone noted that Sech is "rapidly becoming urbano's most wanted collaborator".

He featured on Nicky Jam's 2019 Íntimo album on the song "Atrévete", released in November 2019. The song peaked at number four in Sech's native Panama. Sech also appeared on the song "Ignorantes" with Bad Bunny, included on Bad Bunny's album YHLQMDLG. The song reached the top ten in Panama, Spain and the US Billboard Hot Latin Songs chart, and peaked at number 49 on the US Billboard Hot 100. Other songs Sech was featured includes "Definitivamente" with Daddy Yankee, and "Ganas De Ti" with Wisin & Yandel, with both songs peaking at number two in Panama.

During a Zoom listening party on May 7, 2020, Sech announced that his second studio album, 1 of 1 would be released on May 21, 2020. The album's lead single, "Si Te Vas" with Ozuna, reached the top ten in Panama and Spain. The album also includes the Panamanian top 10 single "Relación" and features appearances from Daddy Yankee, Arcángel, Nando Boom, and Lenny Tavarez. Sech explained that the album also includes "throwbacks to Panama's classic reggae en español sound". "Relación" became Sech's fourth top 10 on the Hot Latin Songs chart and his first solo song to do so. The song also garnered popularity on the video-sharing app TikTok.

On April 15, 2021, Sech released his third studio album called 42, an 11 track album with features from Rauw Alejandro, Wisin, Yandel, Arcángel, and Nicky Jam. The name of this album was chosen as a tribute to Jackie Robinson, who was the first African American in the MLB. The number also has significance to Sech because of how it was passed on to Panamanian baseball player, Mariano Rivera. 

Also in 2021, he released "Volando (Remix)" with Bad Bunny and Mora, Una Nota with J Balvin, "Tus Lágrimas" with Mora, and "Se Le Ve" with Dímelo Flow, Justin Quiles, Lenny Tavárez, Arcangel, De La Ghetto, and Dalex.

At the end of 2021, Sech and DJ Khaled released the song "Borracho". Sech also released a single called "Noche De Teteo" as his first song in 2022. Also, via Instagram stories, Sech said that the name for his upcoming album would be "Bienvenidos al Bloke." The date for this album has yet to be announced.

Musical style
Sech possesses a tenor vocal range. A Billboard staff member wrote that Sech's music contains "soothing vocals, sensual urban fusion melodies, and lyrics that focus on romance, dreams and positive vibes". In an interview with Billboard, Sech mentioned El General as being an influence on his music. "Otro Trago" was described by Rolling Stone as a "piano-reggaeton ballad about drinking and dancing the heartbreak away". Sech is a fan of jazz music and expressed a desire to incorporate jazz music into his compositions. He described his musical experimentation by saying, "Everything changes so fast. Today, we're singing reggaeton. Tomorrow, we'll be singing in Arabic! You never know where things are gonna go, and that's an exciting challenge".

Discography

Studio albums

Collaborative albums

Mixtapes

Extended plays

Singles

As a lead artist

As a featured artist

Other charted songs

Guest appearances

See also
Number-one singles of 2019 (Panama)

Notes

References

 

1993 births
Living people
21st-century Panamanian male singers
21st-century Panamanian singers
Panamanian reggaeton musicians
Panamanian songwriters
Panamanian people of African descent
People from Panama City
Latin music songwriters